The Last Performance of the Circus Wolfson (German: Die letzte Galavorstellung des Zirkus Wolfson) is a 1928 German silent film directed by Domenico Gambino and starring Hermann Vallentin.

The film's art direction was by Willi Herrmann and Fritz Willi Krohn.

Cast
 Hermann Vallentin as Direktor Wolfson 
 Hellen Allan as Eva, seine Tochter  
 Saetta Gambino as Gaston Serato  
 Adelmo Burini as Garrigan - Artist  
 Mario Cusmich as Der Sekretär  
 Fritz Ruß as Clown Polidor  
 Lydia Potechina as Dame mit heißem Herzen  
 Johanna Ewald as Die gestrenge Gattin  
 Oreste Bilancia as Der Herr Gemahl  
 Ernst Hofmann as Der Jüngling, Pantomime  
 Hilde Jennings as Das Mädchen, Pantomime  
 Raimondo Van Riel as Der Satan, Pantomime  
 Xenia Ledoff as Die Tänzerin, Pantomime

References

Bibliography
 Fritz Güttinger. Köpfen Sie mal ein Ei in Zeitlupe!: Streifzüge durch die Welt des Stummfilms. Fink, 1992.

External links

1928 films
Films of the Weimar Republic
German silent feature films
Films directed by Domenico Gambino
Circus films
German black-and-white films